Paul Philip Glasziou  (born 21 May 1954) is an Australian academic physician known for his research in evidence-based medicine. He is Professor of Evidence-Based Medicine at Bond University, where he is also Director of the Faculty of Health Sciences and Medicine. He was the director of the Centre for Evidence-Based Medicine at the University of Oxford in England from 2003 to 2010. In July 2010, he received an NHMRC Australia Fellowship at Bond University. In March 2015, he was elected a fellow of the Australian Academy of Health and Medical Sciences. He was appointed an Officer of the Order of Australia in the 2021 Queen's Birthday Honours.

References

External links
Faculty profile

1954 births
Living people
Officers of the Order of Australia
Fellows of the Australian Academy of Health and Medical Sciences
Australian medical doctors
Medical doctors from Queensland
Australian medical researchers
Academic staff of Bond University
Academics of the University of Oxford
People in evidence-based medicine
People educated at Brisbane State High School